Marisa Ryan (born November 20, 1974) is an American actress, best known for her role as Nina Grabowski in the HBO series Sex and the City, as Elizabeth Cooper-MacGillis in the CBS sitcom Major Dad (1989–1993), and as Abby Bernstein in the 2001 comedy film Wet Hot American Summer, its Netflix prequel series, Wet Hot American Summer: First Day of Camp (2015) and its Netflix sequel series Wet Hot American Summer: Ten Years Later (2017).

Career
Ryan made her screen debut in a small role in the 1983 film Without a Trace. From 1989 to 1993, she starred as Elizabeth Cooper-MacGillis in the CBS sitcom Major Dad opposite Gerald McRaney. She later went to star in the Independent films Love Always (1996), Slaves to the Underground (1997), Taylor's Return (1997), and With or Without You (1998). In 1998, Ryan joined the cast of Fox police drama series, New York Undercover as Det. Nell Delaney, during the show's fourth and final season. She later guest-starred on The Practice, Sex and the City, Law & Order: Special Victims Unit, and Law & Order.

In 2001, Ryan co-starred as Abby Bernstein in the ensemble cast satirical comedy film Wet Hot American Summer. She reprised her role in the Netflix prequel series, Wet Hot American Summer: First Day of Camp in 2015. She also appeared in films Don's Plum (2001), Riding in Cars with Boys (2001), and Brooklyn Lobster (2005). In 1997, she made her directorial debut with the independent short film Three Women of Pain which she also co-wrote.

Personal life
Ryan was born in Manhattan, New York. In 1993, Ryan married actor Jeremy Sisto. They divorced in 2002, after nine years of marriage.

Filmography

Film

Television

References

External links

1974 births
20th-century American actresses
21st-century American actresses
Actresses from New York City
American child actresses
American film actresses
American television actresses
Living people
People from Manhattan